Let's Have a Murder is a 1950 British comedy crime film directed by John E. Blakeley and starring Jimmy Jewel, Ben Warriss and Lesley Osmond. It was made by Mancunian Films at their studios in Manchester. Two private detectives are hired to clear a friend accused of murder.

Cast
 Jimmy Jewel as Jimmy Jewsbury 
 Ben Warriss as Ben Warren 
 June Elvin as Nurse Harrison 
 Lesley Osmond as Marjorie Gordon 
 Stewart Rome as Colonel Gordon 
 David Greene as Professor Ralph Witkoff

References

Bibliography
 Hunter, I.Q. & Porter, Laraine. British Comedy Cinema. Routledge, 2012.

External links

1950 films
British crime comedy films
1950 comedy films
Films directed by John E. Blakeley
Films set in Paris
1950 crime films
British black-and-white films
Films shot in Greater Manchester
1950s English-language films
1950s British films